The 2006 CAA men's basketball tournament was held from March 3–6, 2006 at the Richmond Coliseum in Richmond, Virginia. George Mason would advance to the Final Four in the NCAA Tournament, the first CAA team to do so.

Bracket

Honors

References

-2006 CAA men's basketball tournament
Colonial Athletic Association men's basketball tournament
CAA men's basketball tournament
CAA men's basketball tournament
Sports competitions in Virginia
Basketball in Virginia